The National Army of Uruguay is the land force branch of the Armed Forces of the Oriental Republic of Uruguay.

Organization 
The army consists of some 15,000 personnel organized into four divisions. His superior is the President of the Republic, who acts as Commander in Chief of the Armed Forces.

Educational and instruction 

 Liceo Militar General Artigas (General Artigas Military High School)
 Escuela Militar (Military School)
 IMAE Instituto Militar de Armas y Especialidades (Military Institute of Weapons and Specialties)
 IMES Instituto Militar de Estudios Superiores (Military Institute of Higher Studies)
 Escuela de Ingenieros del Ejército (Army Engineers School)
 ECOME Escuela de Comunicaciones del Ejército (Army School of Communications)
 C.I.A.C.A. Centro de Instrucción de Artillería de Campaña y Antiaérea "Cnel. Antonio E. Trifoglio" ('Field and Air Defense Artillery Instruction Center "Cnel. Antonio E. Trifoglio")
 CIMA Centro de Instrucción de Material y Armamento (Material and Armament Instruction Center)
 Comisión de Ciencia y Tecnología del Ejército (Army Science and Technology Commission'')

List of commanders-in-chief of the army (1973–Present)

Equipment

Ranks

References